Buying the Cow is a 2002 American screwball comedy film directed by Walt Becker and starring Jerry O'Connell, Ryan Reynolds, Alyssa Milano and Bridgette L. Wilson.

Plot   
David is too afraid to commit to his girlfriend Sarah, who is pressuring him to get married. While she goes away to New York for work for two months, David's friends persuade him to experience the dating scene one more time. Meanwhile, David's womanizing friend Mike gets drunk one night and mistakenly believes he has had sex with a man, and afterwards makes several awkward attempts to come out of the closet, even though he is not really gay.

Cast

Reception 
Robert Pardi of TV Guide rated it 1/5 stars and called it "memorable for all the wrong reasons" because of its misogyny and homophobia.

References

External links 
 
 

2000 films
2000 LGBT-related films
2002 romantic comedy films
2002 films
American independent films
American LGBT-related films
American romantic comedy films
American sex comedy films
2000s English-language films
Films set in Los Angeles
Films shot in Los Angeles
Films directed by Walt Becker
2000s sex comedy films
2002 comedy films
2000s American films